Reap the Whirlwind is a role-playing game adventure published by TSR in 1987 for the Marvel Super Heroes role-playing game.

Contents
Reap the Whirlwind is a scenario for the Advanced rules, third in the future-history X-Men series.

Publication history
MX3 Reap the Whirlwind was written by Caroline Spector and Warren Spector, and was published by TSR, Inc., in 1987 as a 32-page book, a large color map, and an outer folder.

Reception

Reviews

References

Marvel Comics role-playing game adventures
Role-playing game supplements introduced in 1987